The Klosterbrauerei Andechs is a monastic brewery in Andechs, Upper Bavaria, Germany, well known for its Andechser beers. The brewery is run by the monks of Andechs Abbey, a priory of St. Boniface's Abbey, a Benedictine abbey situated 40 km away in Munich. It is the only monastic brewery in Germany that brews Bock beer year-round for nationwide distribution. A portion of the beer is served on-site at the abbey; the remainder is exported throughout Germany and worldwide.

History 
The earliest documented reference to beer being brewed in Andechs Abbey dates to 1455. The Benedictine monks have continued the brewing tradition in the centuries since. A seven-story malt house was built on the site in 1906, and the first bottling facility was added in 1950. In 1972, the abbey decided to create a separate brewing facility at the foot of the mountain, which was completed in 1974, followed by a new brewing building in 1983. The fermentation and storage facilities were expanded in 2006, and the brewing house was renovated in 2007.

Beers 
The best-known beer is the Andechser Doppelbock Dunkel, with an original extract of 18.5% (18.5° Plato or 1.076 original gravity) and over 7% Alcohol by volume. In addition, the brewery produces a Helles, Spezial Hell, Bergbock Hell, Export Dunkel, Hefeweizen, and Dunkelweizen.

References

External links 
 
 Interview with Father Valentin Zeigler

1455 establishments
Beer brands of Germany
Breweries in Germany
Companies based in Bavaria
Pages translated from German Wikipedia